is a 190,000-square-meter (2.0 million sq ft) mixed-use development in Yurakucho, Tokyo, Japan. Completed in March 2018, the project includes office, commercial, and dining and entertainment facilities.

The project site overlooks Hibiya Park on a site previously occupied by the Showa era Sanshin Building. The primary developer is Mitsui Fudosan, working in concert with several partners.  The same developer owns and operates the larger Tokyo Midtown (東京ミッドタウン) multipurpose project in Tokyo’s Roppongi neighbourhood.

The building’s concave glass exterior facing Hibiya Park produces noticeable solar glare onto the streets immediately to the south of the building echoing one of the design flaws of London’s 20 Fenchurch Street skyscraper.

See also

List of tallest buildings and structures in Tokyo

References

External links

Official Site in English

Commercial buildings completed in 2018
2018 establishments in Japan
Skyscrapers in Tokyo
Buildings and structures in Chiyoda, Tokyo
Mitsui Fudosan
Buildings by Hopkins Architects
Mixed-use developments